Ratanpur is a small village in Bhatar CD block in Bardhaman Sadar North subdivision of Purba Bardhaman district in the state of West Bengal, India with total 316 families residing.

Transport 

Population 
In Ratanpur, most of the villagers are from Schedule Caste (SC). Schedule Caste (SC) constitutes 63.26% while Schedule Tribe (ST) was 0.14% of the total population in Ratanpur  village.

Population and house data

References 

Villages in Purba Bardhaman district